Jeepers Creepers is a 2001 horror film written and directed by Victor Salva. It stars Gina Philips and Justin Long as Trish and Darry Jenner, two siblings in college who are pursued by the Creeper, a demonic serial killer portrayed by Jonathan Breck. The film takes its name from the 1938 song of the same name, which is featured in the film under a version by Paul Whiteman. Patricia Belcher and Eileen Brennan also appear in supporting roles, with Salva making a cameo appearance.

Produced by American Zoetrope and the German companies Cinerenta-Cinebeta and Cinerenta Medienbeteiligungs KG, Jeepers Creepers began production in August 2000 after Salva convinced the studios to cast Philips and Long with the help of executive producer Francis Ford Coppola. Due to severe budget cuts, the third act of the project was re-written during production. Filming took place for two months in Florida in Ocala, Dunnellon, Reddick and Lake Panasoffkee. The film was theatrically released by United Artists and Metro-Goldwyn-Mayer on August 31, 2001. It was a commercial success, despite mixed reviews, and grossed $59 million on a $10 million budget. It was the first film in the Jeepers Creepers film series.

Plot

Trish Jenner and her brother Darry are traveling home from college for spring break. As they drive through the Florida countryside, an old truck threateningly tailgates them but eventually passes. They later observe the same truck parked next to an abandoned church with the driver sliding what appears to be bodies wrapped in blood-stained sheets into a large pipe sticking out of the ground. Having noticed their car pass by, the driver pursues and runs them off the road.

After the truck drives off, Darry convinces Trish to go back to the church. Upon investigation, Darry hears noises coming from within the pipe and crawls inside with Trish holding on to his feet. Trish accidentally drops Darry, and he falls to the bottom of the pipe. Inside, he finds a dying man with stitches running down his stomach and hundreds of bodies sewn to the basement's walls and ceiling, including the bodies of a prom couple that had gone missing twenty-three years prior. Darry eventually finds his way out of the pipe, finds Trish, and they both flee the scene and attempt to contact the police at a diner. At the diner, they are phoned by a strange woman who tells them they are in danger. She then plays the song "Jeepers Creepers" on a record player, telling them one of them will die screaming while hearing the song. Confused, they ignore her warning and leave with two police officers providing a security escort. As they travel, the police learn that the church has caught fire and any potential evidence has been destroyed. The police are then attacked and killed by the driver, who loads their bodies into the truck. Witnessing the aftermath, Trish and Darry drive off in terror.

The pair stop at the house of a reclusive, elderly woman, begging her to call the police. The woman complies until she notices the driver hiding in her yard, who kills her before revealing its inhuman face to Trish and Darry. Trish repeatedly runs the driver over with her car but is left horrified as she sees a giant wing tear through its trench coat and flap in the air. The pair leave and drive to a local police station, where they are approached by psychic Jezelle Gay Hartman, the woman who called them at the diner. She tells them the true nature of their pursuer: It is an ancient creature, known as "the Creeper," which awakens every 23rd spring for twenty-three days to feast on human body parts, which then form parts of its own body. She also tells them that it seeks out its victims through fear, and by smelling the fear from Trish and Darry, it has found something it likes.

The wounded Creeper arrives at the police station, cuts off the power, and eats several prisoners to heal. The Creeper is swarmed by police but it kills a number of them and evades capture. Trapped, Jezelle warns Trish and Darry that one of them will die a horrible death. Darry demands to know who, and Jezelle looks at Trish. The Creeper finds them but spares Jezelle before cornering Trish and Darry in an upstairs interrogation room. After sniffing them, the Creeper throws Trish aside and chooses Darry. Trish offers her life for her brother's, but the Creeper escapes out of a window and flies away with Darry. The next day, Trish is picked up by her parents, and Jezelle returns home in regret. In an abandoned factory, it is revealed that the Creeper has removed the back of Darry's head and taken his eyes, all the while "Jeepers Creepers" plays on the Creeper's record player.

Cast
Credits adapted from the British Film Institute.

Production

Development

Several critics and moviegoers believe the film was loosely inspired by the case of Dennis DePue. In the state of Michigan in 1990, brother-and-sister Ray and Marie Thornton caught DePue dumping his dead wife's body behind an abandoned schoolhouse. The murder case and subsequent manhunt of DePue were featured on an episode of Unsolved Mysteries on March 20, 1991. The following day, DePue committed suicide during a shootout with police in Mississippi. The episode's reenactment of events, and many details contained throughout, were found to be similar to the opening scenes of the film. Writer and director Victor Salva has not confirmed nor denied whether the film took inspiration from the case, but instead said it borrowed elements from Night of the Living Dead (1968) and Duel (1971).

It took Salva one month to write the screenplay, down from his average of six months. He said he wanted the Creeper to kill characters that were for the most part male because he was "very tired of seeing women slaughtered and raped" in cinema. To conceal his final girl-styled ending from viewers, Salva employed various red herrings throughout the first act so viewers would think Trish was going to die. His original script also featured a twenty-page third act which was eventually scrapped during production. In it, Darry drives the Creeper's truck into a train, unsuccessfully sacrificing himself in an attempt to kill the Creeper. The entire sequence had been storyboarded by Brad Parker in preparation for the shoot but, due to a budget cut of $1 million, it had to be removed and rewritten. Because of this, Gina Philips and Justin Long were allowed to improvise many of their scenes during the third act. Some scenes cut from the script were used in its sequel, Jeepers Creepers 2.

Salva wanted the film's defining moment to be the reveal that the Creeper was not human and, to do so, kept the character mysterious throughout the first half by re-writing certain scenes, going against the advice of agents, managers and acclaimed directors. Salva gave his finished screenplay to executive producer Francis Ford Coppola, who had helped finance Clownhouse (1989), Salva's directorial debut. As a result of the successes of the 1999 films The Blair Witch Project and The Sixth Sense, Salva received four offers from interested studios within two days of him completing the script. Seven to eight months later, United Artists and Metro-Goldwyn-Mayer acquired the distribution rights for $2.5 million. United Artists agreed to finance a quarter of the film's $10 million budget, with Germany's Cinerenta-Cinebeta and Cinerenta Medienbeteiligungs KG supplying the rest.

Casting

Auditions took place in Los Angeles. Philips said she wanted to star after finding the script too scary to finish in one night. She auditioned twice by herself for the role of Trish, and then once with a shortlist of actors who were auditioning for the role of Darry, one of which was Long. Salva said Philips had an "intense focus" during the audition process and that it was "her authenticity that got her the part." Long said he was unsure going in to audition. Salva said Long was cast because of his natural way of portraying fear. American Zoetrope initially planned to cast A-list actors for the lead parts, but Coppola convinced them to instead cast Long and Philips.

The role for the Creeper was written specifically for Lance Henriksen, who dropped out of the project. Jonathan Breck auditioned to face his own fears of the horror genre. After being told that he would be showing his own interpretation of the Creeper, Breck spent his time researching different animal movements. On the day of his audition, he shaved his head and took part in the "sniff test", where he was told to sniff the casting crew while in character. When asked about his shaven head, Breck told the casting director that the Creeper "wouldn't have hair", before getting the part. Salva cast Eileen Brennan as "the cat lady" because he was moved by her performance in the short film Nunzio's Second Cousin. Chris Shepardson played the "dying boy" that Darry finds while in the Creeper's lair. Due to budget reasons, Salva had to write the character without any lines, but during filming, the crew eventually decided to give Shepardson a short line to say. Salva made a cameo appearance in the film as a victim of the Creeper.

Filming

Principal photography began around Central Florida in August 2000, concluding after a period of two months. Opening scenes were shot on the SW 180th Avenue Road in the city of Dunnellon, with the church used in the film, the now-former St. James Church, being located miles away in Ocala. The diner, "Opper's Diner", was a set built in Lake Panasoffkee, and a reference to producer Barry Opper. An abandoned high school in Reddick stood in for the police station, while a now-demolished meatpacking factory in Ocala was used for the finale.

Salva called the filming process "grueling" because they had to work during the summer, facing heat waves and high temperatures. Scenes containing the church's pipe were shot using a six-foot pipe outside the church and two pipes in a sound stage warehouse, where the final scene was shot. Due to the low budget, the art department's cafeteria was also used during filming and only a few fake bodies were made to appear in the Creeper's lair. According to Long, he and Philips tried to avoid interacting with Breck throughout the entire shoot to avoid connecting with the actor, which benefited their performances by making them look scared when they were in character.

The Creeper was designed by storyboard artist Brad Parker. Its costume was created by Brian Penikas from Makeup and Monsters while its wings were created by Charles Garcia and digitally rendered by Buddy Gheen, Scott Ramsey, and Bob Morgenroth. The Creeper's truck used on-screen, a 1941 Chevy COE and originally a flatbed truck, had its back section created entirely by production designer Steven Legler. During various takes, the truck stopped working due to its old engine.

Music

The film score for Jeepers Creepers was composed and conducted by Bennett Salvay, who also served as a music producer alongside Salva. Its music was recorded and mixed at the Todd-AO Scoring Stage by Shawn Murphy, and edited by Chad DeCinces. The album was mastered by Patricia Sullivan Fourstar at Bernie Grundman Mastering.

Track listing

Release

Theatrical
Jeepers Creepers premiered at the München Fantasy Filmfest in Germany, and at the Fantasia International Film Festival in Canada in July 2001. The film was theatrically released in the United States by United Artists and Metro-Goldwyn-Mayer on August 31, 2001. It opened in 2,944 theaters and stayed in release for 126 days. In October, Jeepers Creepers was shown at the Sitges Film Festival and the Bergen International Film Festival. The film had its German release on January 3, 2002, where it opened in 298 theaters. On May 24, 2018, the film was theatrically re-released in Colombia.

Home media
Jeepers Creepers was released on DVD by MGM Home Entertainment on January 8, 2002, featuring two viewing options for viewers: standard or widescreen. A special edition of the DVD includes ten deleted and extended scenes, an audio commentary track featuring Salva, a six-part featurette on the making of the movie titled "Behind the Peepers – The Making of Jeepers Creepers", a photo gallery, and a theatrical trailer. On September 11, 2012, the film was released on Blu-ray by MGM and 20th Century Studios Home Entertainment, containing all of the same features from the DVD. On June 14, 2016, a two-disc Blu-ray Collector's Edition of the film was released by Shout! Factory, featuring a "Then and Now" featurette, interviews with producer Barry Opper and actress Patricia Belcher, and a new audio commentary on the film featuring the voices of Salva, Philips and Long. On October 12, 2020, the film was digitally released by 101 Films, who later released the film in the United Kingdom on a Blu-ray set containing the same features as the ones found in the original special edition of the DVD and the Blu-ray Collector's Edition from Shout! Factory.

Reception

Box office
In its original release, Jeepers Creepers grossed $37.9 million in the United States and Canada and $21.3 million in other countries for a worldwide total of $59.2 million. Its 2018 re-release managed to earn the film $153 thousand in Colombia, bringing the film's worldwide total to $59.4 million.

The film premiered in the United States and Canada on August 31, 2001, in 2,944 theaters on Labor Day weekend. It made $15.8 million in its first four days, ranking 1st in front of Rush Hour 2 ($11.2 million), and broke the record for the highest Labor Day opening weekend previously held by the 1996 film The Crow: City of Angels ($9.8 million). The film was able to hold the record until the release of its sequel, Jeepers Creepers 2 (2003), which made $18.3 million on its own Labor Day weekend. Jeepers Creepers made $18.1 million in its first week, and grossed $6.2 million in its second behind the releases of The Musketeer ($10.3 million) and Two Can Play That Game ($7.7 million).

In the United Kingdom, Jeepers Creepers opened on October 19, 2001, making $2.2 million in its first weekend, and a total of $8.8 million in the country. The film's largest markets after the U.K. were Mexico ($2.5 million), Spain ($2.1 million), and Italy ($2.1 million). In Germany, the film began its theatrical release on January 3, 2002, and grossed $1.3 million. In other countries apart from the United States and Canada, Jeepers Creepers made $21.3 million, bringing its total box office gross to $59.2 million. On May 24, 2018, the film was re-released in Colombia in 83 theaters, earning $153 thousand. Against its $10 million budget, the film was a commercial success.

Critical response
 The website's critical consensus reads: "Jeepers Creepers has a promising start. Unfortunately, the tension and suspense quickly deflates into genre cliches as the movie goes on."  Audiences polled by CinemaScore gave the film an average grade rating of "D" on an A+ to F scale.

Several critics praised the film's first half but criticized the second half. Stephen Holden, from The New York Times, said that once the Creeper was revealed, the film "surrenders its imagination to formulaic plot filler". Writing for The Guardian, Peter Bradshaw said the film "goes right down the pan" after its opening scene and that it is "not genuinely scary or genuinely funny". Los Angeles Times film critic Kevin Thomas shared only positive feedback on the film and said it had the "scariest opening sequence of any horror picture in recent memory" and that "Salva has expertly built up enough sheer terror that [it is] uncomfortable to watch." From The A.V. Club, Nathan Rabin wrote that the film "begins promisingly with an economical first half [...] but once its monster takes center stage, Jeepers Creepers heads downhill in a hurry."

From BBC News, Nev Pierce called it an "unsettling, gory, but intelligent horror flick", and compared it positively to Scream (1996). Writing for the Chicago Tribune, Robert K. Elder said he disliked the film simply because many parts were left unexplained. The GW Hatchet journalist Mira Katz called the film "tragic", criticizing the writing, visual effects and the finale of the film, stating that it would leave the viewer with a "general sense of disappointment". Film critic David Edelstein, from Slate magazine, criticized the film's general storyline and 90-minute runtime but said that "the movie is good enough to put a chill into the late-summer air."

Accolades
At the Sitges Film Festival in 2001, Jeepers Creepers received a nomination for Best Film but lost to Vidocq. The following year, the film was nominated for three awards at the Fangoria Chainsaw Awards, winning for Best Wide-Release Film and Best Supporting Actor (Jonathan Breck). At that same ceremony, Brian Penikas was nominated for Best Makeup/Creature FX for his design of the Creeper but lost to the KNB EFX Group for their work on Thirteen Ghosts. On April 13, 2002, the film received a nomination for Best Movie at the International Horror Guild Awards but lost to the Canadian film Ginger Snaps by John Fawcett. On June 10, 2002, the film earned a Saturn Award nomination for Best Horror Film, while Justin Long was nominated for Best Performance by a Younger Actor.

Sequels

Two direct sequels written and directed by Victor Salva have been released. The first sequel, Jeepers Creepers 2, premiered on August 29, 2003, and takes place a few days after the original. In it, the Creeper pursues a bus filled with teenage students, who try to defeat the creature with the help of Jack Taggart, a man who seeks to avenge the death of his younger son Billy, who had been taken by the Creeper one day prior. The film features a cameo appearance from Justin Long, who reprises his role as Darry, and the appearance of Tom Tarantini, who portrayed a prisoner in the original and Coach Dwayne Barnes in the second film.

In 2015, after Salva shared his intentions in making a film focusing on the return of Gina Philips as Trish Jenner, Jeepers Creepers 3: Cathedral was officially greenlit. However, Philips' role in the film was brought down to a cameo, and the film was released in 2017 by Screen Media Films as simply Jeepers Creepers 3. The film takes place in between the two other films and follows the Creeper as it terrorizes a small community of people attempting to figure out its identity.

A reboot, titled Jeepers Creepers: Reborn, written by Sean Michael Argo and directed by Timo Vuorensola, was released by Screen Media Films on September 19, 2022.

See also
 Jersey Devil
 Spring-heeled Jack

Notes

References

External links

 
 

Jeepers Creepers (film series)
2001 horror films
2000s monster movies
2000s supernatural horror films
2000s teen horror films
American monster movies
American supernatural horror films
American teen horror films
American Zoetrope films
Demons in film
German horror films
German monster movies
Fictional demons and devils
Films about siblings
Films directed by Victor Salva
Films shot in Florida
United Artists films
2000s English-language films
2000s American films
2000s German films